Robert Shvarc (10 December 1932 – 25 April 2003) born in Sarajevo, Bosnia, was an Albanian translator, recognized as one of the best translators from German of the 20th century and beginning of new millennium, writer, and poet. His mother was from Elbasan and his  Jewish father was from Austria, and they lived in Shkodër, Albania. There Robert Shvarc grew up as a lover of his Albanian mother's language and is the first who brought to the Albanian reader some masterpieces of literature such as the novels of Gabriel García Márquez, Erich Maria Remarque, Lion Feuchtwanger, dramas of Bertolt Brecht; books of poetry from Goethe, Schiller, and Heine. Also Shvarc translated into German the best books of many Albanian poets and writers.

Prizes and awards 
 1995 – Embassy of Germany in Tirana, Albania awarded Shvarc the prize "German Federal Cross of Merit" – "Kryqi i meritave gjermane", which was practiced for first time in this country of Balkans. 
 2002 – Shvarc was awarded by Albanian Capitol's Municipality the title Honor Citizen of Tirana.
 2002 – The  President of the Republic of Albania awarded Shvarc the title Great Master – Mjeshtër i Madh (Grand Master of Work).

References 
  Bksh.al

External links 
  lajme.gen.al
 Balkanweb.com
Citizen of Honor in Shkodra

1932 births
2003 deaths
Albanian writers
German–Albanian translators
Writers from Sarajevo
Albanian people of Jewish descent
20th-century translators
People from Shkodër
20th-century German male writers
Recipients of the Order of Merit of the Federal Republic of Germany
German male non-fiction writers
Translators of Johann Wolfgang von Goethe